Lisa-Anne Smith (born 3 October 1978) is an Australian sports shooter. She competed in the  Women's trap in the 2000 Sydney Summer Olympics.

References 

1978 births
Living people
Australian female sport shooters
Shooters at the 2000 Summer Olympics
Olympic shooters of Australia
20th-century Australian women
21st-century Australian women